Evelyn M. Anderson (March 20, 1899 – June 8, 1985) was an American physiologist and biochemist, most known for her co-discovery of adrenocorticotropic hormone (adreno-cortical thyroid hormone or ACTH) in 1934.

Background 

Evelyn Anderson was born in Willmar, Minnesota, to Swedish immigrants parents.  She attended Carleton College in Northfield, Minnesota, where she obtained her bachelor's.  In 1928, she gained her M.D. from the University of California, Berkeley, School of Medicine.  During her time at Berkeley, her research culminated into two papers about vitamin A and nutrition.  She continued on to receive her Ph.D. in biochemistry from the University of Montreal in 1934.  While working on her dissertation, Anderson co-discovered ACTH with James Bertram Collip and David Landsborough Thomson. In a paper published in 1933, she explained its function in the body. In 1935 she published another paper with Collip on the discovery of an anti-thyroid hormone which greatly contributed to the general knowledge and understanding of anti-hormones.

Career 
Anderson returned to the University of California to instruct and became an associate professor of medicine in 1946, while continuing her research on hormone related diseases.  Most notably she discovered with her husband Webb E. Haymaker that Cushing's disease is caused by hyper function of the adrenal cortex.  Anderson also worked with Joseph Abraham Long, professor of embryology,  to develop an apparatus to study the secretions of insulin from the pancreas in a rat model.  This model and technique were later used with an immunochemical assay for human insulin. In 1946, Anderson received an award from the John Simon Guggenheim Memorial Foundation  to work with Phillip Bard, professor and director of the Department of Physiology at Johns Hopkins University.

She then moved to the National Institute of Arthritis and Metabolic Diseases (NIAMD) at the National Institute of Health where she became the chief of Secretion on Endocrinology (1947-1962).  She was Vice President and program chairman of the Endocrine Society (1951-1952). Anderson became a visiting Professor of Physiology at Howard University in 1955, where her research focused on hypothalamic regulation of metabolism.  In 1962 she returned to California where she became head of neuroendocrinology at NASA's Ames Research Center (1962-1969).  She retired from this position in 1969.  During the course of her career, she published over one hundred research papers.

Personal life

Anderson was married in 1936 to noted neurologist Webb Edward Haymaker, M.D. (1902–1984) with whom she had three children and eight grandchildren.

Award and honors 
 John Simon Guggenheim Memorial Foundation Award (1946)
 Honorary doctorate from Carleton College (1954)
Honorary doctorate from the Women's Medical College of Pennsylvania (1961)
 Federal Women's Award recipient (1964)

References

1899 births
1985 deaths
Carleton College alumni
University of California, Berkeley alumni
Université de Montréal alumni
American women biochemists
American physiologists
Women physiologists
University of California, Berkeley faculty
Howard University faculty
American people of Swedish descent
20th-century American women
20th-century American people
American women academics